Newton Abbot Rugby Football Club is an English rugby union team based the town of Kingsteignton, just outside of Newton Abbot in Devon. The club runs two senior teams and a ladies side as well as the full range of junior teams.  The first XV play in South West 1 West, a level six league in the English rugby union system, following their relegation from South West Premier at the end of the 2018-19 season.

Background/History

Early history

The Rugby club of the Newton Rifle Volunteers, commonly known as Newton Rifles, changed its name to Newton Abbot RFC in 1886.  That year's annual supper recalled how the club had been formed after Rev George Townsend Warner had invited the volunteers to play football after the annual shooting matches.   This earlier event took place on 18 November 1878.   The club was the third in Newton after Newton College (who changed from Association to Rugby in 1875) and the recently formed GWR club. The Volunteers' first reported match against another club took place on 25 January 1879.  
For years the club has wrongly claimed a formation date of 1873, now disproved. During the early years of the club the kit changed from green and red hoops to red, white and amber in 1897, before settling with an all white kit in 1903, thus earning the nickname of 'All Whites'.  This period is also notable for the two Newton players who gained international caps for England while at the club, full-back Henry Tristram who was capped in 1887 and forward Denys Dobson who was capped in 1902.  To date these are the only Newton Abbot players who have received international caps with England.

Prior to World War II the club had the distinction of hosting some of the top international sides on their tours of the country, including the New Zealand All Blacks in 1905, 1924 and 1935, the South African Springboks in 1907, and Australia in 1908.  Indeed, it was during their time at Newton Abbot that the Australian team gave themselves the nickname of the 'Wallabies' following questioning from a local reporter.  On the pitch the 1920s were one of the most successful in the club's history, winning the Devon Senior Cup for the first time in 1923, reclaiming it in 1924 before going on to claim a third title in 1927.  The reserve side also did well, winning the Devon Junior Cup in 1921 and 1925.  Although the club had some good seasons in the 1950s and 1960s the glory years were behind them and by the advent of league rugby the club was on the decline.

League rugby

The advent of league rugby in 1987 saw Newton Abbot placed in Cornwall/Devon - a tier 8 league in the English rugby union system.  Their debut season in the leagues was one to forget as the club finished in bottom spot with 10 losses from 10 games played and were relegated to Devon League 1.  Although relegation was disappointing, the club started to rebuild and by 1990 they had won their first county silverware since the 1920s, claiming the Havill Plate.  Newton spent the next decade in Devon League 1, until after three seasons spent as runners up the club finally gained promotion as champions at the end of 1997-98.

Success was quick to follow the very next season as Newton made it two promotions in a row at the end of 1998-99, this time winning Cornwall/Devon ahead of runners up Withycombe and gaining promotion to Western Counties West.  In 2004 the club won their first Devon Senior Cup since 1927, defeating Brixham 33-31 in an exciting final at Astley Park.  The 2005-06 season saw Newton finish second in the league behind Torquay Athletic, qualifying for a promotion playoff against the runners up from Tribute Western Counties North.   Due to a stronger league performance, Newton Abbot were granted home advantage, and they made it count by sealing a 24-12 victory over Walcot at Rackerhayes.  Also of interest during this period was the formation in Newton Abbot of rugby league side Devon Sharks in 2005.  The Sharks played home games at Rackerhayes until 2008 when they moved to a purpose built ground in Torquay.

The 2008-09 season saw Newton Abbot once more compete for promotion, fighting their way to a second-place finish, some way adrift of champions Taunton Titans who won all their games.  As runners up the club found themselves with a second stab at promotion, heading east to take on South West 2 East runners up, Reading, but ultimately ending up disappointed as they went down 10-16 at Holme Park.  The following season Newton Abbot were once more in with a shout with promotion in what had been re-branded Tribute South West 1 after the RFU had re-organized the league structure.  As with the previous season the club once again finished well behind the league champions, this time in the form of Hartpury College, who like Taunton finished unbeaten, winning all their games.  Despite finishing 10 points behind Hartpury, Newton still did enough to secure home advantage for the promotion play-off.  Once again Rackerhayes was the scene of a second home victory in the play-offs as Newton went on to beat High Wycombe 23-14 to seal promotion to National League 3 South West - the highest level the club had reached in its history.

Ground

The Rackerhayes rugby ground is situated on the edge of an industrial estate on southern outskirts of Kingsteignton, near the Newton Abbot Racecourse, and about 2 miles walk from the town of Newton Abbot.  The rugby ground consists of three pitches including two training pitches and backs on to the Rackerhayes fishing complex.  The main pitch is next to the club house and has standing capacity for approximately 1,000 spectators including a couple of small covered standing areas.  There is also a covered stand with seating for around 150 people, making the overall capacity of Rackerhayes about 1,150.  In-ground parking is available next to the club-house, with additional parking in the surrounding industrial estate.

One of the two training pitches has a covered stand for standing spectators.  Both training pitches are of decent quality.  Reserve and youth fixtures are fulfilled on these pitches.

Season summary

Honours
 Devon Junior Cup winners (2): 1921, 1925 (both won by reserve side)
 Devon Senior Cup champions (4): 1923, 1924, 1927, 2004
 Havill Plate winners: 1990
 Devon League 1 champions: 1997–98
 Cornwall & Devon champions: 1998–99
 Tribute Western Counties (north v west) promotion play-off winners: 2005–06
 South West 1 (east v west) promotion play-off winners: 2009–10

Notable former players
 Denys Dobson - Forward who would go on to gain six caps for England during the 1902-03 season while playing at the club.  Also made four appearances for the British and Irish Lions during their 1904 tour of Australia.
 Henry Tristram - Full-back who was capped by England while playing at the club in 1887 - one of the five caps he would make for his country.  As well as playing rugby union he was also a first-class cricketer who appeared for both Durham County Cricket Club and Oxford University.

Notes

References

External links
 Official club website

English rugby union teams
Rugby clubs established in 1873
Rugby union in Devon
Newton Abbot
Kingsteignton